Sirindhornia pulchella is a species of moth of the family Tortricidae. It is found in Thailand. The habitat consist of evergreen forests.

The length of the forewings is 4.8–5 mm for males and 4.5 mm for females. The basal two-fifths of the forewings is white with several slender, connected black lines and a larger mark at one-thirds, as well as isolated, minute black dots more distally. The distal three-fifths of the forewings is orange.

Etymology
The species name refers to the wing pattern and color and is derived from Latin pulchella (meaning beautiful).

References

Moths described in 2014
Enarmoniini